The rufous-vented tit (Periparus rubidiventris) is an Asian songbird species in the tit and chickadee family (Paridae). Some of its subspecies were formerly assigned to its western relative the rufous-naped tit (P. rufonuchalis), or these two were considered entirely conspecific.

Taxonomy
The tit was formerly placed in the genus Parus. The four subspecies are:
 Periparus rubidiventris rubidiventris – S rim of Himalayas from NW to NE India and N Nepal.
 Periparus rubidiventris beavani (Jerdon, 1863) – Beavan's rufous-vented tit – S rim of Himalayas in NE India and Bhutan.
 Periparus rubidiventris whistleri – SE rim of Himalayas in SW China and adjacent N Myanmar and extreme NE India. Sometimes included in beavani.
 Periparus rubidiventris saramatii – Very localised in NW Myanmar.

Distribution and habitat

This tit is a native of the western Himalayas, but has a very large range, occurring in parts of Bhutan, China, Pakistan, India, Myanmar and Nepal. Its natural habitats are boreal forests and temperate forests. In Bhutan for example, P. r. beavani is a rather common all-year resident in moist Bhutan fir (Abies densa) forests, between approximately 3,000 and 4,000 meters ASL. Widespread and by no means rare, it is not considered a threatened species by the IUCN.

Footnotes

References
 Bangs, Outram (1932): Birds of western China obtained by the Kelley-Roosevelts expedition. Field Mus. Nat. Hist. Zool. Ser. 18(11): 343–379. Fulltext at the Internet Archive
 
 Gill, Frank B.; Slikas, Beth & Sheldon, Frederick H. (2005): Phylogeny of titmice (Paridae): II. Species relationships based on sequences of the mitochondrial cytochrome-b gene. Auk 122(1): 121–143. DOI: 10.1642/0004-8038(2005)122[0121:POTPIS]2.0.CO;2 HTML abstract
 Inskipp, Carol; Inskipp, Tim & Sherub (2000): The ornithological importance of Thrumshingla National Park, Bhutan. Forktail 14: 147–162. PDF fulltext

External links 
 
 

rufous-vented tit
Birds of North India
Birds of Nepal
Birds of Bhutan
Birds of Central China
Birds of Yunnan
rufous-vented tit
rufous-vented tit
Taxonomy articles created by Polbot